Albert Stüdemann was a German field hockey player. He competed in the men's tournament at the 1908 Summer Olympics.

References

External links
 

Year of birth missing
Year of death missing
German male field hockey players
Olympic field hockey players of Germany
Field hockey players at the 1908 Summer Olympics
Place of birth missing